This article discusses blewit mushrooms. A number of subjects share similar spellings. See Blewitt and Bluet for disambiguation.

Blewit refers to two closely related species of edible agarics in the genus Clitocybe, the wood blewit (Clitocybe nuda) and the field blewit or blue-leg (C.saeva). Both species are treated by some authorities as belonging to the genus Lepista.

Classification
Both species have been treated by many authorities as belonging to the Clitocybe segregate genus Lepista. Recent molecular research suggests the genus Lepista is nested within Clitocybe.

Edibility
Both wood blewits and field blewits are generally regarded as edible, but they are known to cause allergic reactions in sensitive individuals. This is particularly likely if the mushroom is consumed raw, though allergic reactions are known even from cooked blewits.  Wood blewits contain the sugar trehalose, which is edible for most people.

Field blewits are often infested with fly larvae and do not store very well; they should therefore be used soon after picking. They are also very porous, so they are best picked on a dry day.

In most mycologists' opinion, the blewits are considered excellent mushrooms, despite their coloration. Blewits can be eaten as a cream sauce or sautéed in butter, but it is important not to eat them raw, which could lead to indigestion. They can also be cooked like tripe or as omelette filling, and wood blewits also make good stewing mushrooms.

Footnotes

External links 
 "Mushroom-Collecting.com - The Blewit"
 All that Rain Promises and More - Blewit

Edible fungi
Clitocybe
Fungus common names